West Craven High School may refer to:

West Craven High School, Barnoldswick, a secondary school in Barnoldswick, Lancashire, England
West Craven High School (Vanceboro, North Carolina), a high school in Vanceboro, North Carolina, United States